Malaysia–Peru relations refers to bilateral foreign relations between Malaysia and Peru. Malaysia has an embassy in Lima, which was established in 1996, while Peru has an embassy in Kuala Lumpur, which was established in 1992. The countries desire to improve their relations in tourism, trade and investment, agriculture and forestry, health, science and technology, energy, education, rural development, poverty alleviation, gastronomy, and art and culture.

Trade
Malaysia is one of the main destination for Peruvian exports with the total trade in 2012 records $235 million. Peruvian exports to Malaysia total around $28 million while Malaysian exports with $207 million.

Agreements
In 1995, an agreement on mutual promotion and protection of investments has been signed between the two countries.

See also
List of ambassadors of Peru to Malaysia

Further reading 
  Guia Practica para Malasia Ministry of Foreign Commerce and Tourism (Peru)

References 

 
Peru
Bilateral relations of Peru